Notocrypta feisthamelii, the spotted demon, is an Indomalayan butterfly belonging to the family Hesperiidae. The name honours the French entomologist Joachim François Philibert Feisthamel.

The named subspecies are    

N. f. rectifasciata Leech  West China
N. f. alysos  (Moore, [1866])  Himalaya to Burma, Thailand, Vietnam, Laos, Langkawi, Malaysia, Yunnan
N. f. celebensis  (Staudinger, 1889)  Celebes
N. f. avattana  Fruhstorfer, 1911  Java
N. f. samyutta  Fruhstorfer, 1911  Lombok
N. f. alinkara  Fruhstorfer, 1911  Philippines (Mindanao)
N. f. padhana  Fruhstorfer, 1911 Batjan

The larva feeds on Costus, Maranta, Musa, Amomum, Curcuma, Elettaria, Hedychium, Zingiber.

References

f
Butterflies of Asia
Butterflies of Indochina